Donald Agu (born 12 December 1975) is a retired Nigerian football player.

Career 
He started his career in Enugu Rangers, and in 1994, came to play to Europe. First he played for FK Obilić in the First League of FR Yugoslavia one season, before moving to Italy to play for Salernitana Calcio. Then he moved to Germany and played with FC Augsburg. Next, he joined the Bundesliga side Eintracht Frankfurt but failed to play a league match. Between 2000 and 2002, Agu played for SSV Reutlingen in the 2. Bundesliga. In January 2002, Agu moved to Bangladesh and played in Abahani Limited, before returning to Nigeria where he ended his career playing again for Enugu Rovers.

References

Living people
1975 births
Nigerian footballers
Nigerian expatriate footballers
Association football defenders
Rangers International F.C. players
FK Obilić players
Expatriate footballers in Serbia and Montenegro
U.S. Salernitana 1919 players
Expatriate footballers in Italy
FC Augsburg players
Eintracht Frankfurt players
SSV Reutlingen 05 players
Expatriate footballers in Germany
Abahani Limited (Dhaka) players
Expatriate footballers in Bangladesh
2. Bundesliga players
Nigerian expatriate sportspeople in Serbia and Montenegro